Hardin County is a county located in the U.S. state of Texas, United States. As of the 2020 census, its population was 56,231. The county seat is Kountze. The county is named for the family of William Hardin from Liberty County, Texas.

Hardin County is part of the Beaumont-Port Arthur, TX metropolitan statistical area.

History
The county is named for the family of William Hardin (1801-1839), a settler, judge, and postmaster. The Hardin family cemetery is located north of Liberty.

The current Hardin County Courthouse was built in 1959. It is at least the third courthouse to serve Hardin County.

Geography

The county is largely covered by the dense forest of the Big Thicket. It is crossed by numerous small streams and creeks that drain the county into the Neches River, which forms the eastern boundary of the county.

Major highways
   U.S. Highway 69/U.S. Highway 287
  U.S. Highway 96
  State Highway 105
  State Highway 326
  State Highway 327

Adjacent counties
 Tyler County (northern)
 Jasper County (east)
 Orange County (southeast)
 Jefferson County (south)
 Liberty County (southwest)
 Polk County (northwest)

Its eastern boundaries with Jasper County and Orange County are formed by the Neches River. The southern boundary with Jefferson County is formed by Pine Island Bayou

National protected area
 Big Thicket National Preserve (part)

Communities

Cities
 Kountze (county seat)
 Lumberton
 Rose Hill Acres
 Silsbee
 Sour Lake

Census-designated places
 Pinewood Estates
 Wildwood (partly in Tyler County)

Unincorporated communities
 Batson
 Honey Island
 Saratoga
 Thicket
 Village Mills
 Votaw

Ghost town
 Bragg

Demographics

Note: the U.S. Census Bureau treats Hispanic/Latino as an ethnic category. This table excludes Latinos from the racial categories and assigns them to a separate category. Hispanics/Latinos can be of any race.

As of the 2010 census, Hardin County had a population of 54,635. The ethnic and racial composition of the population was 88.0% non-Hispanic white, 5.8% African American, 0.4% Native American, 0.5% Asian, 1.3% from some other race, and 1.3% from two or more races.

As of the census of 2000,  48,073 people, 17,805 households, and 13,638 families resided in the county. The population density was 54 people/sq mi (21/km2). The 19,836 housing units averaged 22/sq mi (9/km2). The racial makeup of the county was 90.86% White, 6.91% Black or African American, 0.32% Native American, 0.23% Asian, 0.01% Pacific Islander, 0.74% from other races, and 0.93% from two or more races. About 2.54% of the population were Hispanic or Latino of any race.

Of the 17,805 households, 37.2% had children under  18 living with them, 62.6% were married couples living together, 10.2% had a female householder with no husband present, and 23.4% were not families; 20.7% of all households were made up of individuals, and 9.2% had someone living alone who was 65  or older. The average household size was 2.68 and the average family size was 3.09.

In the county, the age distribution was 27.8% under 18, 8.5% from 18 to 24, 28.3% from 25 to 44, 23.2% from 45 to 64, and 12.2% who were 65 or older. The median age was 36 years. For every 100 females, there were 96.7 males. For every 100 females age 18 and over, there were 92.4 males.

The median income for a household in the county was $37,612, and for a family was $42,890. Males had a median income of $35,881 versus $22,823 for females. The per capita income for the county was $17,962. About 8.8% of families and 11.20% of the population were below the poverty line, including 13.3% of those under age 18 and 10.6% of those age 65 or over.

Politics

United States Congress

See also

 National Register of Historic Places listings in Hardin County, Texas
 Recorded Texas Historic Landmarks in Hardin County

References

External links
 Hardin County government's website
 Hardin County in Handbook of Texas Online at the University of Texas

 
1858 establishments in Texas
Populated places established in 1858
Beaumont–Port Arthur metropolitan area